The 2015 FIFA Beach Soccer World Cup Final was the last match of the 2015 FIFA Beach Soccer World Cup which took place on July 19, 2015 at the Praia da Baía, in Espinho. The final was contested between Tahiti, who had never competed in the FIFA final before, and Portugal, who were back to a final ten years after reaching the final of the inaugural Beach Soccer World Cup. Team Portugal won the FIFA Beach Soccer World Cup for the first time.

Road to the final

Match details

References

Final
2015